The Europe Zone was one of the three regional zones of the 1966 Davis Cup.

32 teams entered the Europe Zone in total. For this year's tournament the Europe Zone was split into two sub-zones, with the winners of each sub-zone going on to compete in the Inter-Zonal Zone against the winners of the America Zone and Eastern Zone.

Brazil defeated France in the Zone A final, and West Germany defeated South Africa in the Zone B final, resulting in both Brazil and West Germany progressing to the Inter-Zonal Zone.

Zone A

Draw

First round

France vs. Romania

Finland vs. Canada

Czechoslovakia vs. Austria

Portugal vs. Israel

Poland vs. Sweden

Turkey vs. Egypt

Spain vs. Yugoslavia

Denmark vs. Brazil

Quarterfinals

France vs. Canada

Czechoslovakia vs. Israel

Poland vs. Egypt

Spain vs. Brazil

Semifinals

France vs. Czechoslovakia

Poland vs. Brazil

Final

France vs. Brazil

Zone B

Draw

First round

Luxembourg vs. Switzerland

West Germany vs. Norway

Hungary vs. Greece

Great Britain vs. New Zealand

Italy vs. Soviet Union

Monaco vs. Morocco

Netherlands vs. Ireland

Belgium vs. South Africa

Quarterfinals

Switzerland vs. West Germany

Hungary vs. Great Britain

Netherlands vs. South Africa

Semifinals

West Germany vs. Great Britain

Italy vs. South Africa

Final

West Germany vs. South Africa

References

External links
Davis Cup official website

Davis Cup Europe/Africa Zone
Europe Zone
Davis Cup